Lake Nerpichye is a lake in the Kamchatka Krai of Russia.

Etymology
It has its name Nerpichye from the Russian word Нерпа (nerpa), which means so much like (fresh water) poetry. The Turkish word Kultuchnoye means lagoon.

References 

Lakes of Kamchatka Krai